Västra Borsökna is a village situated in Eskilstuna Municipality, Södermanland County, Sweden with 482 inhabitants in 2005.

References 

Populated places in Södermanland County
Populated places in Eskilstuna Municipality